Austin James Bauer (born 7 February 1997) is a Canadian badminton player. He started playing badminton at aged 5, and in 2014, he competed at the World Junior Championships in Malaysia. Bauer trained at the Calgary Winter Club in a beginners group, then he moved to the  ClearOne badminton club. He won silver at the 2017 Pan Am Badminton Championships for men's doubles with his partner, Ty Alexander Lindeman.

Achievements

Pan Am Championships 
Men's doubles

Pan Am Junior Championships 
Boys' doubles

References

External links 
 

1997 births
Living people
Sportspeople from Calgary
Canadian male badminton players